"Dr. Mabuse" is a Eurodance song originally performed by German band Blue System. It was released as the first and only single from Blue System's album X – Ten, in October 1994. It was produced, written and arranged by Dieter Bohlen.

Track listing 

 Maxi CD single
 "Dr. Mabuse" (Radio Version I) - 3:49	
 "Dr. Mabuse" (Video Version) - 3:51
 "Dr. Mabuse" (Radio Version II) - 3:20
 "Dr. Mabuse" (Maxi Edit) - 6:10
 "Dr. Mabuse" (Instrumental) - 3:45

 12" promo single
 "Dr. Mabuse" (Radio Version I) - 3:49
 "Dr. Mabuse" (Instrumental) - 3:45
 "Dr. Mabuse" (Maxi Edit) - 6:10

 7" single
 "Dr. Mabuse" (Radio Version I) - 3:49
 "Dr. Mabuse" (Instrumental) - 3:45

Personnel 
 Artwork by Thomas Sassenbach and Ariola.
 Co-producer: Luis Rodríguez.
 Photography: Esser & Strauss.
 Produced, arranged and written by Dieter Bohlen.

References 

Blue System songs
1994 singles
Eurodance songs
Songs written by Dieter Bohlen
Song recordings produced by Dieter Bohlen
Ariola Records singles
1994 songs